Khasiaclunea is a genus of plants in the family Rubiaceae. It has only one known species, Khasiaclunea oligocephala, known from the high mountains of the Darjeeling region of India through Assam and Bhutan to Burma (Myanmar).

References

Monotypic Rubiaceae genera
Naucleeae
Flora of Assam (region)
Flora of East Himalaya
Flora of Myanmar